See Foster Island (Ontario) for the island in the Canadian province of Ontario.

Foster Island is an island in Seattle, Washington, USA's Union Bay. Bisected by State Route 520, it is part of the Washington Park Arboretum. There is a walking trail connecting Foster Island and the adjacent Marsh Island to mainland Seattle via a set of bridges and boardwalks.

Foster Island was once the Duwamish burial ground, Stitici, where the dead were placed in boxes tied up in the branches of trees.

References 

Islands of Seattle
Lake islands of Washington (state)
Uninhabited islands of Washington (state)
Islands of King County, Washington